Roman Abrosimov (born July 31, 1994) is a Russian professional ice hockey defenceman who is currently playing with HC Vityaz in the Kontinental Hockey League (KHL). He is a one-time Russian Champion, helping Ak Bars Kazan to the Gagarin Cup in 2018.

Awards and honours

References

External links

1994 births
Living people
Ak Bars Kazan players
Bars Kazan players
HC Sochi players
HC Neftekhimik Nizhnekamsk players
Sportspeople from Kazan
HC Vityaz players